Cutlips is an unincorporated community in Braxton County, West Virginia, United States. Their Post Office  is closed.

Cutlips most likely was named after the local Cutlips family.

References 

Unincorporated communities in West Virginia
Unincorporated communities in Braxton County, West Virginia